Bothrocophias microphthalmus, or the small-eyed toad-headed pit viper, is a species of venomous snake in the family Viperidae. The species is endemic to northwestern South America.

Geographic range
B. microphthalmus is found in Brazil, Colombia, Ecuador, Peru, and Bolivia.

The type locality is "between Balsa Puerto and Moyobamba, Peru".

Description and Characteristics 
The small eyed toad headed pit viper

References

Further reading
Cope ED. 1875. "Report on the Reptiles brought by Professor James Orton from the middle and upper Amazon, and Western Peru". J. Acad. Nat. Sci. Philadelphia (2) 8: 159–183. (Bothrops microphthalmus, new species, pp. 182–183).

microphthalmus
Snakes of South America
Reptiles of Bolivia
Reptiles of Colombia
Reptiles of Ecuador
Reptiles of Peru
Reptiles described in 1875